In mathematics, the Abhyankar–Moh theorem states that if  is a complex line in the complex affine plane , then every embedding of  into  extends to an automorphism of the plane. It is named after Shreeram Shankar Abhyankar and Tzuong-Tsieng Moh, who published it in 1975. More generally, the same theorem applies to lines and planes over any algebraically closed field of characteristic zero, and to certain well-behaved subsets of higher-dimensional complex affine spaces.

References
.

Theorems in algebraic geometry